Cryptolechia micracma is a moth in the family Depressariidae. It was described by Edward Meyrick in 1910. It is found in Sri Lanka.

The wingspan is 12–13 mm. The forewings are deep ochreous-yellow, sprinkled with dark fuscous. The stigmata is dark fuscous and there is a dark fuscous spot on the costa at two-thirds. There is also a terminal fascia of dark fuscous suffusion or irroration. The hindwings of the males are pale yellowish, while those of the females are light grey.

References

Moths described in 1910
Cryptolechia (moth)
Taxa named by Edward Meyrick